Maarounah (Arabic: معرونة) is a Syrian village in the Al-Tall District of the Rif Dimashq Governorate. According to the Syria Central Bureau of Statistics (CBS), Maarounah had a population of 1,153 in the 2004 census.

References

External links

Populated places in Al-Tall District